Aloizs Tumiņš (22 March 1938 – 29 January 2009) was a Latvian boxer from the Soviet Union.

He won two medals at the European Amateur Boxing Championships: gold medal at Belgrade 1961 and silver one at Moscow 1963 both in the Light Welterweight division.

References

1938 births
2009 deaths
Sportspeople from Riga
Latvian male boxers
Soviet male boxers
Light-welterweight boxers